Serixia sedata is a species of beetle in the family Cerambycidae. It was described by Francis Polkinghorne Pascoe in 1862.

Subspecies
 Serixia sedata occidentalis Breuning, 1950
 Serixia sedata gigantea Breuning, 1950
 Serixia sedata sedata Pascoe, 1862

References

Serixia
Beetles described in 1862